A by-election for the seat of Sydney-Phillip in the New South Wales Legislative Assembly was held on 14 October 1895 because of the resignation of Dick Meagher.

Background
Meagher had defended George Dean who had been charged with attempting to murder his wife. Dean was convicted and sentenced to death, however Meagher managed to persuade two out of three royal commissioners to find that the conviction was unsafe and, as a result, Dean was pardoned. The publicity from the case helped Meagher win the election for Sydney-Phillip in July 1895. Rumours began to circulate that Dean had confessed to buying the poison. Jack Want, the Attorney General, read to the Legislative Council an account by Sir Julian Salomons of his conversation with Meagher, in which Meagher told Salomons that Dean had confessed to Meagher. Meagher initially denied the accusation, however subsequently confessed stating "I am determined to endure mental torture no longer, nor to stifle the voice of truth … This awful lesson of my life I will endeavour to atone for in another clime. My resignation of my seat in Parliament accompanies this declaration".

Sir Henry Parkes announced himself as a candidate, however he withdrew prior to the nominations.

Dates

Result

Dick Meagher resigned in disgrace in relation to the pardon of George Dean.

Aftermath
Meagher was struck off the roll of solicitors and was convicted of conspiracy to pervert the cause of justice, but the conviction was quashed on appeal. Meagher was returned to the Legislative Assembly as the member for Tweed at the election in 1895. It would take 25 years and an act of parliament before he was re-admitted as a solicitor.

See also
Electoral results for the district of Sydney-Phillip
List of New South Wales state by-elections

Notes

References

1895 elections in Australia
New South Wales state by-elections
1890s in New South Wales